The Hyosung RX125 (also known as the XRX125 in some markets) was a lightweight dual purpose motorcycle manufactured by the South Korean motorcycle company Hyosung. The Hyosung RX125 was produced from 1998 until 2009 and available in many markets including: Asia, Europe, North America, and Oceania. In Brazil it has been assembled from CKD kits by the now-defunct Kasinski Motos, and rebadged as a Kasinski product. The RX125 features an air- and oil-cooled 125cc single cylinder SOHC engine. The maximum power output of the engine is 9 kW at 8500 rpm.

References

Hyosung motorcycles
Dual-sport motorcycles
Motorcycles introduced in 1998